Seberang Takir (Jawi: سبرڠ تاكير) is a small town in Kuala Nerus District, Terengganu, Malaysia. The  town consists of several fishing villages namely Kampung Baru Seberang Takir, Kampung Hulu Takir, Kampung Padang Takir, Kampung Batin and Kampung Seberang Takir itself.

History 
The name "Seberang" means "across" referring to the place (Seberang Takir) being across the Terengganu river separating it from the city of Kuala Terengganu. The name "takir" however means "cut" so the full name of the town is "Across to cut". Based on Terengganu history, Seberang Takir is a place where prisoners were held to serve capital punishment for their crimes by cutting off hands or feet.

Seberang Takir later developed into a permanent settlement as kampongs started popped up along the northern shores of Terengganu river. For most of its history, Seberang Takir was put under the administration of Kuala Terengganu until 2014, where it became part of the newly-created district of Kuala Nerus (but the town still remains under the municipal jurisdiction of the Kuala Terengganu City Council even after the split).

Attractions 
Kuala Nerus side of Kuala Terengganu Drawbridge is located in Kampung Seberang Takir. Besides the bridge, the new mosque that is Masjid Kampung Seberang Takir is also located in the town and has become the main attraction in Seberang Takir. The parking lots near the Drawbridge is a famous food truck hotspot called Foodtruck Panoramik.

References 

Kuala Nerus District
Towns in Terengganu